The 1961 New York Yankees season was the 59th season for the team. The team finished with a record of 109–53, eight games ahead of the Detroit Tigers, and won their 26th American League pennant. New York was managed by Ralph Houk. The Yankees played their home games at Yankee Stadium. In the World Series, they defeated the Cincinnati Reds in 5 games. This season was best known for the home run chase between Roger Maris and Mickey Mantle, with the former beating Babe Ruth's single season record by hitting 61.

The 1961 Yankees are often mentioned as a candidate for the unofficial title of greatest baseball team in history.

Offseason
 December 14, 1960: Bob Cerv was drafted from the Yankees by the Los Angeles Angels in the 1960 MLB expansion draft.
 January 16, 1961: Mickey Mantle became the highest paid baseball player by signing a $75,000 contract.
 Prior to 1961 season: Art López was signed as an amateur free agent by the Yankees.
 Prior to 1961 season: Ole Miss Rebels football quarterback Jake Gibbs was signed as an amateur free agent by the Yankees.

Regular season
The 1961 season was notable for the race between center fielder Mickey Mantle and right fielder Roger Maris to break Babe Ruth's record of 60 home runs in a season (set in 1927). Maris eventually broke the record, hitting his 61st home run on October 1, the season's final day. During the season, Maris had seven multi-home run games; in a doubleheader against the Chicago White Sox, he hit four home runs.

1961 was an expansion year, with the American League increasing from eight to ten teams, the first expansion in the 61-year history of the league. The old schedule of 154 games (seven opponents multiplied by 22 games apiece) was replaced by 162 games (nine opponents multiplied by 18 games apiece) which led to some controversy due to the eight extra games that Maris had to try to hit 61.

Ultimately, when Maris broke Ruth’s record in game 162, baseball commissioner Ford Frick instigated "The Asterisk", which designated that Maris had only accomplished the feat in a longer season, and disallowed any reference to him as the record-holder. When commissioner Fay Vincent removed "The Asterisk" in 1991, Maris was finally given credit as the single-season home run record-holder. However, Maris had died in 1985, never knowing that the record belonged to him.

In addition to the individual exploits of Maris and Mantle, the '61 Yankees hit a major league record 240 home runs.  The record stood until 1996 when the Baltimore Orioles, with the added benefit of the designated hitter, hit 257 home runs as a team.

Roger Maris

In 1961, the American League expanded from eight to ten teams, generally watering down the pitching, but leaving the Yankees pretty much intact. Yankee home runs began to come at a record pace. One famous photograph lined up six 1961 Yankee players, including Mantle, Maris, Yogi Berra, Elston Howard, Johnny Blanchard, and Bill Skowron, under the nickname "Murderers Row", because they hit a combined 207 home runs that year. The title "Murderers Row", originally coined in 1918, had most famously been used to refer to the Yankees side of the late 1920s.

As mid-season approached, it seemed quite possible that either Maris or Mantle, or perhaps both, would break Babe Ruth's 34-year-old home run record. Unlike the home run race of 1998, in which the competition between Mark McGwire and Sammy Sosa was given extensive positive media coverage, sportswriters in 1961 began to play the "M&M Boys" against each other, inventing a rivalry where none existed, as Yogi Berra has testified in recent interviews.

The 1961 home run race between Maris and Mantle was dramatized in the 2001 film 61*, filmed under the direction of Billy Crystal.

Roger Maris 61 Home Runs
 
The Yankees played one tie game which was later made up, and hence took 163 games to achieve 162 decisions.

Season standings

Record vs. opponents

Monthly record

Record vs. American League

Notable transactions
 May 8, 1961: Lee Thomas, Ryne Duren, and Johnny James was traded by the Yankees to the Los Angeles Angels for Bob Cerv and Tex Clevenger.
 July 1, 1961: Roy White was signed as an amateur free agent by the Yankees.

Roster

Game log

|- style="text-align:center;background-color:#ffbbbb"
| 1 || April 11 || Twins || 6–0 || Ramos (1–0) || Ford (0–1) || || 14,607 || 0–1
|- style="text-align:center;background-color:#bbffbb"
| 2 || April 15 || Athletics || 5–3 || Turley (1–0) || Daley (0–1) || Stafford (1) || 11,802 || 1–1
|- style="text-align:center;background-color:#bbffbb"
| 3 || April 17 || Athletics || 3–0 || Ford (1–1) || Walker (0–1) || || 1,947 || 2–1
|- style="text-align:center;background-color:#bbffbb"
| 4 || April 20 || Angels || 7–5 || Ditmar (1–0) || Grba (0–1) || Stafford (2) || || 3–1
|- style="text-align:center;background-color:#bbffbb"
| 5 || April 20 || Angels || 4–2 || Turley (2–0) || Garver (0–1) || Arroyo (1) || 7,059 || 4–1
|- style="text-align:center;background-color:#bbffbb"
| 6 || April 21 || @ Orioles || 4–2 || Ford (2–1) || Barber (1–1) || || 12,368 || 5–1
|- style="text-align:center;background-color:#ffbbbb"
| 7 || April 22 || @ Orioles || 5–3 || Wilhelm (1–0) || Duren (0–1) || || 12,536 || 5–2
|- style="text-align:center;background-color:#ffffcc"
| 8 || April 22 || @ Orioles || 5 – 5  || || || || 14,126 || 5–2
|- style="text-align:center;background-color:#ffbbbb"
| 9 || April 23 || @ Orioles || 4–1 || Estrada (1–1) || McDevitt (0–1) || Hall (1) || 18,704 || 5–3
|- style="text-align:center;background-color:#ffbbbb"
| 10 || April 24 || @ Tigers || 4–3 || Lary (3–0) || Turley (2–1) || || 5,662 || 5–4
|- style="text-align:center;background-color:#bbffbb"
| 11 || April 26 || @ Tigers || 13 – 11  || Arroyo (1–0) || Aguirre (0–1) || || 4,676 || 6–4
|- style="text-align:center;background-color:#bbffbb"
| 12 || April 27 || Indians || 4–3 || Ditmar (2–0) || Antonelli (0–2) || || 8,897 || 7–4
|- style="text-align:center;background-color:#bbffbb"
| 13 || April 29 || Indians || 4–2 || Terry (1–0) || Perry (2–1) || Arroyo (2) || 14,624 || 8–4
|- style="text-align:center;background-color:#bbffbb"
| 14 || April 30 || @ Senators || 4–3 || Ford (3–1) || Donovan (0–4) || Arroyo (3) || || 9–4
|- style="text-align:center;background-color:#ffbbbb"
| 15 || April 30 || @ Senators || 2–1 || Woodeshick (1–1) || Sheldon (0–1) || Burnside (1) || 21,904 || 9–5

|- style="text-align:center;background-color:#bbffbb"
| 16 || May 2 || @ Twins || 6 – 4  || Coates (1–0) || Pascual (2–1) || Arroyo (4) || 16,669 || 10–5
|- style="text-align:center;background-color:#bbffbb"
| 17 || May 3 || @ Twins || 7–3 || Turley (3–1) || Ramos (2–1) || || 18,158 || 11–5
|- style="text-align:center;background-color:#bbffbb"
| 18 || May 4 || @ Twins || 5–2 || Ford (4–1) || Kaat (1–2) || Coates (1) || 18,179 || 12–5
|- style="text-align:center;background-color:#bbffbb"
| 19 || May 5 || @ Angels || 5–4 || McDevitt (1–1) || Clevenger (2–1) || Arroyo (5) || 17,801 || 13–5
|- style="text-align:center;background-color:#ffbbbb"
| 20 || May 6 || @ Angels || 5–3 || Grba (2–2) || Ditmar (2–1) || || 19,865 || 13–6
|- style="text-align:center;background-color:#ffbbbb"
| 21 || May 7 || @ Angels || 5–3 || Kline (1–0) || Coates (1–1) || Clevenger (1) || 19,722 || 13–7
|- style="text-align:center;background-color:#ffbbbb"
| 22 || May 9 || @ Athletics || 5–4 || Herbert (2–1) || Arroyo (1–1) || Archer (1) || 13,623 || 13–8
|- style="text-align:center;background-color:#bbffbb"
| 23 || May 10 || @ Athletics || 9–4 || Clevenger (3–1) || Daley (3–4) || || 15,986 || 14–8
|- style="text-align:center;background-color:#ffbbbb"
| 24 || May 12 || Tigers || 4–3 || Lary (5–1) || Coates (1–2) || || 23,556 || 14–9
|- style="text-align:center;background-color:#ffbbbb"
| 25 || May 13 || Tigers || 8–3 || Regan (3–0) || Turley (3–2) || || 18,036 || 14–10
|- style="text-align:center;background-color:#bbffbb"
| 26 || May 14 || Tigers || 5 – 4  || Coates (2–2) || Aguirre (1–2) || || || 15–10
|- style="text-align:center;background-color:#bbffbb"
| 27 || May 14 || Tigers || 8–6 || Coates (3–2) || Bunning (2–3) || || 40,968 || 16–10
|- style="text-align:center;background-color:#ffbbbb"
| 28 || May 16 || Senators || 3–2 || Woodeshick (2–1) || Stafford (0–1) || Sisler (5) || 10,050 || 16–11
|- style="text-align:center;background-color:#ffbbbb"
| 29 || May 17 || Senators || 8–7 || Burnside (1–2) || Ditmar (2–2) || Gabler (1) || 6,197 || 16–12
|- style="text-align:center;background-color:#ffbbbb"
| 30 || May 19 || @ Indians || 9–7 || Latman (3–0) || Clevenger (3–2) || Allen (2) || 21,240 || 16–13
|- style="text-align:center;background-color:#ffbbbb"
| 31 || May 20 || @ Indians || 4–3 || Funk (4–2) || Stafford (0–2) || || 8,431 || 16–14
|- style="text-align:center;background-color:#bbffbb"
| 32 || May 21 || Orioles || 4–2 || Ford (5–1) || Estrada (2–3) || || || 17–14
|- style="text-align:center;background-color:#ffbbbb"
| 33 || May 21 || Orioles || 3–2 || Barber (5–3) || Sheldon (0–2) || Wilhelm (5) || 47,890 || 17–15
|- style="text-align:center;background-color:#bbffbb"
| 34 || May 22 || Orioles || 8–2 || Coates (4–2) || Fisher (1–5) || Arroyo (6) || 16,923 || 18–15
|- style="text-align:center;background-color:#bbffbb"
| 35 || May 24 || Red Sox || 3–2 || Terry (2–0) || Nichols (0–1) || || 7,673 || 19–15
|- style="text-align:center;background-color:#bbffbb"
| 36 || May 25 || Red Sox || 6–4 || Ford (6–1) || Muffett (0–4) || Arroyo (7) || 13,087 || 20–15
|- style="text-align:center;background-color:#ffbbbb"
| 37 || May 28 || White Sox || 14–9 || Lown (2–2) || Arroyo (1–2) || Pierce (2) || || 20–16
|- style="text-align:center;background-color:#bbffbb"
| 38 || May 28 || White Sox || 5–3 || Coates (5–2) || McLish (2–5) || || 44,435 || 21–16
|- style="text-align:center;background-color:#ffbbbb"
| 39 || May 29 || @ Red Sox || 2–1 || Delock (3–1) || Ford (6–2) || || 21,804 || 21–17
|- style="text-align:center;background-color:#bbffbb"
| 40 || May 30 || @ Red Sox || 12–3 || Stafford (1–2) || Conley (2–4) || Coates (2) || 19,582 || 22–17
|- style="text-align:center;background-color:#bbffbb"
| 41 || May 31 || @ Red Sox || 7–6 || Sheldon (1–2) || Muffett (0–5) || McDevitt (1) || 17,318 || 23–17

|- style="text-align:center;background-color:#ffbbbb"
| 42 || June 1 || @ Red Sox || 7–5 || Monbouquette (4–5) || Turley (3–3) || Stallard (1) || 5,257 || 23–18
|- style="text-align:center;background-color:#bbffbb"
| 43 || June 2 || @ White Sox || 6–2 || Ford (7–2) || McLish (2–6) || || 38,410 || 24–18
|- style="text-align:center;background-color:#ffbbbb"
| 44 || June 3 || @ White Sox || 6 – 5  || Hacker (1–0) || Ditmar (2–3) || || 16,480 || 24–19
|- style="text-align:center;background-color:#bbffbb"
| 45 || June 4 || @ White Sox || 10–1 || Stafford (2–2) || Pierce (1–5) || || 28,362 || 25–19
|- style="text-align:center;background-color:#bbffbb"
| 46 || June 5 || Twins || 6–2 || Coates (6–2) || Lee (0–2) || Arroyo (8) || || 26–19
|- style="text-align:center;background-color:#bbffbb"
| 47 || June 5 || Twins || 6–1 || Sheldon (2–2) || Stobbs (0–2) || || 23,103 || 27–19
|- style="text-align:center;background-color:#bbffbb"
| 48 || June 6 || Twins || 7–2 || Ford (8–2) || Kralick (4–4) || Arroyo (9) || 17,129 || 28–19
|- style="text-align:center;background-color:#bbffbb"
| 49 || June 7 || Twins || 5–1 || Terry (3–0) || Ramos (3–7) || || 9,016 || 29–19
|- style="text-align:center;background-color:#bbffbb"
| 50 || June 8 || Athletics || 6–1 || Stafford (3–2) || Bass (4–3) || || || 30–19
|- style="text-align:center;background-color:#ffbbbb"
| 51 || June 8 || Athletics || 9–6 || Archer (3–1) || McDevitt (1–2) || || 13,157 || 30–20
|- style="text-align:center;background-color:#bbffbb"
| 52 || June 9 || Athletics || 8–6 || Arroyo (2–2) || Herbert (3–6) || || 22,418 || 31–20
|- style="text-align:center;background-color:#bbffbb"
| 53 || June 10 || Athletics || 5–3 || Ford (9–2) || Nuxhall (4–2) || || 17,272 || 32–20
|- style="text-align:center;background-color:#bbffbb"
| 54 || June 11 || Angels || 2–1 || Terry (4–0) || McBride (5–4) || || || 33–20
|- style="text-align:center;background-color:#bbffbb"
| 55 || June 11 || Angels || 5–1 || Sheldon (3–2) || Grba (5–5) || Arroyo (10) || 37,378 || 34–20
|- style="text-align:center;background-color:#bbffbb"
| 56 || June 12 || Angels || 3–1 || Stafford (4–2) || Bowsfield (2–2) || || 16,363 || 35–20
|- style="text-align:center;background-color:#ffbbbb"
| 57 || June 13 || @ Indians || 7–2 || Perry (5–4) || Coates (6–3) || Funk (5) || 21,704 || 35–21
|- style="text-align:center;background-color:#bbffbb"
| 58 || June 14 || @ Indians || 11–5 || Ford (10–2) || Bell (4–6) || Arroyo (11) || 25,095 || 36–21
|- style="text-align:center;background-color:#bbffbb"
| 59 || June 15 || @ Indians || 3 – 2  || Terry (5–0) || Funk (7–5) || || 23,350 || 37–21
|- style="text-align:center;background-color:#ffbbbb"
| 60 || June 16 || @ Tigers || 4–2 || Regan (7–2) || Stafford (4–3) || || 51,744 || 37–22
|- style="text-align:center;background-color:#ffbbbb"
| 61 || June 17 || @ Tigers || 12–10 || Foytack (4–4) || Daley (4–9) || Fox (4) || 51,509 || 37–23
|- style="text-align:center;background-color:#bbffbb"
| 62 || June 18 || @ Tigers || 9–0 || Ford (11–2) || Lary (10–4) || Arroyo (12) || 44,459 || 38–23
|- style="text-align:center;background-color:#ffbbbb"
| 63 || June 19 || @ Athletics || 4–3 || Archer (5–1) || Arroyo (2–3) || || 16,715 || 38–24
|- style="text-align:center;background-color:#bbffbb"
| 64 || June 20 || @ Athletics || 6–2 || Stafford (5–3) || Nuxhall (4–3) || Coates (3) || 19,928 || 39–24
|- style="text-align:center;background-color:#bbffbb"
| 65 || June 21 || @ Athletics || 5–3 || Daley (5–9) || Shaw (3–6) || Arroyo (13) || 19,416 || 40–24
|- style="text-align:center;background-color:#bbffbb"
| 66 || June 22 || @ Athletics || 8–3 || Ford (12–2) || Bass (4–6) || Arroyo (14) || 17,254 || 41–24
|- style="text-align:center;background-color:#ffbbbb"
| 67 || June 23 || @ Twins || 4–0 || Pascual (5–9) || Turley (3–4) || || 30,940 || 41–25
|- style="text-align:center;background-color:#bbffbb"
| 68 || June 24 || @ Twins || 10–7 || Sheldon (4–2) || Cueto (0–2) || Arroyo (15) || 35,199 || 42–25
|- style="text-align:center;background-color:#bbffbb"
| 69 || June 25 || @ Twins || 8–4 || Stafford (6–3) || Kralick (6–5) || Coates (4) || 35,152 || 43–25
|- style="text-align:center;background-color:#bbffbb"
| 70 || June 26 || @ Angels || 8–6 || Ford (13–2) || Donohue (1–2) || Arroyo (16) || 18,870 || 44–25
|- style="text-align:center;background-color:#ffbbbb"
| 71 || June 27 || @ Angels || 7–6 || Bowsfield (4–2) || Daley (5–10) || Grba (2) || 16,108 || 44–26
|- style="text-align:center;background-color:#ffbbbb"
| 72 || June 28 || @ Angels || 5–3 || Duren (3–8) || Turley (3–5) || Donohue (3) || 14,674 || 44–27
|- style="text-align:center;background-color:#bbffbb"
| 73 || June 30 || @ Senators || 5–1 || Ford (14–2) || Donovan (3–8) || || 28,019 || 45–27

|- style="text-align:center;background-color:#bbffbb"
| 74 || July 1 || @ Senators || 7–6 || Arroyo (3–3) || Sisler (1–3) || || 16,015 || 46–27
|- style="text-align:center;background-color:#bbffbb"
| 75 || July 2 || @ Senators || 13–4 || Daley (6–10) || Burnside (1–5) || Arroyo (17) || 19,794 || 47–27
|- style="text-align:center;background-color:#bbffbb"
| 76 || July 4 || Tigers || 6–2 || Ford (15–2) || Mossi (9–2) || || || 48–27
|- style="text-align:center;background-color:#ffbbbb"
| 77 || July 4 || Tigers || 4 – 3  || Lary (12–4) || Stafford (6–4) || Fox (6) || 74,246 || 48–28
|- style="text-align:center;background-color:#bbffbb"
| 78 || July 5 || Indians || 6–0 || Sheldon (5–2) || Bell (5–9) || || 24,377 || 49–28
|- style="text-align:center;background-color:#bbffbb"
| 79 || July 6 || Indians || 4–0 || Stafford (7–4) || Stigman (2–2) || || 37,136 || 50–28
|- style="text-align:center;background-color:#bbffbb"
| 80 || July 7 || Red Sox || 14–3 || Daley (7–10) || Conley (3–7) || || 29,199 || 51–28
|- style="text-align:center;background-color:#bbffbb"
| 81 || July 8 || Red Sox || 8–5 || Ford (16–2) || Delock (5–5) || Arroyo (18) || 23,381 || 52–28
|- style="text-align:center;background-color:#bbffbb"
| 82 || July 9 || Red Sox || 3–0 || Sheldon (6–2) || Monbouquette (8–7) || || || 53–28
|- style="text-align:center;background-color:#ffbbbb"
| 83 || July 9 || Red Sox || 9–6 || Schwall (7–2) || Terry (5–1) || Earley (1) || 47,875 || 53–29
|- style="text-align:center;background-color:#bbcaff"
| – || July 11 || 30th All-Star Game || colspan=7 | National League vs. American League (Candlestick Park, San Francisco) NL defeats AL, 5–4
|- style="text-align:center;background-color:#bbffbb"
| 84 || July 13 || @ White Sox || 6–2 || Stafford (8–4) || Wynn (7–2) || Arroyo (19) || 43,960 || 54–29
|- style="text-align:center;background-color:#ffbbbb"
| 85 || July 14 || @ White Sox || 6–1 || Pizarro (5–3) || Sheldon (6–3) || || 43,450 || 54–30
|- style="text-align:center;background-color:#bbffbb"
| 86 || July 15 || @ White Sox || 9 – 8  || Arroyo (4–3) || Hacker (2–2) || || 37,730 || 55–30
|- style="text-align:center;background-color:#bbffbb"
| 87 || July 16 || @ Orioles || 2–1 || Daley (8–10) || Barber (10–7) || || 38,487 || 56–30
|- style="text-align:center;background-color:#bbffbb"
| 88 || July 17 || @ Orioles || 5–0 || Ford (17–2) || Pappas (6–5) || || 44,332 || 57–30
|- style="text-align:center;background-color:#bbffbb"
| 89 || July 18 || @ Senators || 5–3 || Arroyo (5–3) || McClain (7–9) || || 17,695 || 58–30
|- style="text-align:center;background-color:#ffbbbb"
| 90 || July 19 || @ Senators || 8–4 || Daniels (5–5) || Daley (8–11) || || || 58–31
|- style="text-align:center;background-color:#ffbbbb"
| 91 || July 19 || @ Senators || 12–2 || Donovan (6–8) || Downing (0–1) || || 27,176 || 58–32
|- style="text-align:center;background-color:#bbffbb"
| 92 || July 21 || @ Red Sox || 11–8 || Arroyo (6–3) || Earley (1–4) || || 32,186 || 59–32
|- style="text-align:center;background-color:#bbffbb"
| 93 || July 22 || @ Red Sox || 11–9 || Arroyo (7–3) || Conley (4–9) || || 25,089 || 60–32
|- style="text-align:center;background-color:#ffbbbb"
| 94 || July 23 || @ Red Sox || 5–4 || Schwall (10–2) || Daley (8–12) || || 28,575 || 60–33
|- style="text-align:center;background-color:#bbffbb"
| 95 || July 25 || White Sox || 5–1 || Ford (18–2) || Baumann (7–8) || Arroyo (20) || || 61–33
|- style="text-align:center;background-color:#bbffbb"
| 96 || July 25 || White Sox || 12–0 || Stafford (9–4) || Pizarro (6–4) || || 46,240 || 62–33
|- style="text-align:center;background-color:#bbffbb"
| 97 || July 26 || White Sox || 5–2 || Sheldon (7–3) || Herbert (7–9) || || 22,366 || 63–33
|- style="text-align:center;background-color:#bbffbb"
| 98 || July 27 || White Sox || 4–3 || Terry (6–1) || Pierce (5–7) || Arroyo (21) || 20,529 || 64–33
|- style="text-align:center;background-color:#ffbbbb"
| 99 || July 28 || Orioles || 4–0 || Brown (8–3) || Daley (8–13) || || 39,623 || 64–34
|- style="text-align:center;background-color:#bbffbb"
| 100 || July 29 || Orioles || 5–4 || Ford (19–2) || Fisher (4–10) || || 42,990 || 65–34
|- style="text-align:center;background-color:#ffbbbb"
| 101 || July 30 || Orioles || 4–0 || Barber (12–8) || Stafford (9–5) || || || 65–35
|- style="text-align:center;background-color:#ffbbbb"
| 102 || July 30 || Orioles || 2–1 || Pappas (7–6) || Daley (8–14) || Hall (3) || 57,180 || 65–36
|- style="text-align:center;background-color:#bbcaff"
| – || July 31 || 31st All-Star Game || colspan=7 | National League vs. American League (Fenway Park, Boston) AL tied NL, 1–1

|- style="text-align:center;background-color:#bbffbb"
| 103 || August 2 || Athletics || 6–5 || Arroyo (8–3) || Archer (7–6) || || || 66–36
|- style="text-align:center;background-color:#bbffbb"
| 104 || August 2 || Athletics || 12–5 || Terry (7–1) || Ditmar (2–6) || Reniff (1) || 23,616 || 67–36
|- style="text-align:center;background-color:#ffbbbb"
| 105 || August 3 || Athletics || 6–1 || Shaw (7–9) || Daley (8–15) || || 12,584 || 67–37
|- style="text-align:center;background-color:#bbffbb"
| 106 || August 4 || Twins || 8 – 5  || Arroyo (9–3) || Pleis (3–2) || || 24,109 || 68–37
|- style="text-align:center;background-color:#bbffbb"
| 107 || August 5 || Twins || 2–1 || Coates (7–3) || Kralick (10–7) || || 18,880 || 69–37
|- style="text-align:center;background-color:#bbffbb"
| 108 || August 6 || Twins || 7 – 6  || Reniff (1–0) || Moore (4–4) || || || 70–37
|- style="text-align:center;background-color:#bbffbb"
| 109 || August 6 || Twins || 3–2 || Sheldon (8–3) || Schroll (0–1) || || 39,408 || 71–37
|- style="text-align:center;background-color:#bbffbb"
| 110 || August 7 || Angels || 4–1 || Daley (9–15) || McBride (9–8) || || 13,944 || 72–37
|- style="text-align:center;background-color:#bbffbb"
| 111 || August 8 || Angels || 5 – 4  || Arroyo (10–3) || Fowler (5–5) || || 24,084 || 73–37
|- style="text-align:center;background-color:#bbffbb"
| 112 || August 9 || Angels || 2–0 || Coates (8–3) || Bowsfield (8–4) || || 17,261 || 74–37
|- style="text-align:center;background-color:#bbffbb"
| 113 || August 10 || Angels || 3–1 || Ford (20–2) || Donohue (4–5) || Arroyo (22) || 15,575 || 75–37
|- style="text-align:center;background-color:#bbffbb"
| 114 || August 11 || @ Senators || 12–5 || Terry (8–1) || McClain (7–13) || Reniff (2) || 22,601 || 76–37
|- style="text-align:center;background-color:#ffbbbb"
| 115 || August 12 || @ Senators || 5–1 || Donovan (8–8) || Stafford (9–6) || || 15,870 || 76–38
|- style="text-align:center;background-color:#ffbbbb"
| 116 || August 13 || @ Senators || 12–2 || Daniels (7–6) || Daley (9–16) || || || 76–39
|- style="text-align:center;background-color:#bbffbb"
| 117 || August 13 || @ Senators || 9–4 || Coates (9–3) || Kutyna (6–4) || || 27,368 || 77–39
|- style="text-align:center;background-color:#ffbbbb"
| 118 || August 15 || White Sox || 2–1 || Pizarro (8–5) || Ford (20–3) || || 49,059 || 77–40
|- style="text-align:center;background-color:#bbffbb"
| 119 || August 16 || White Sox || 5–4 || Terry (9–1) || Lown (6–5) || || 29,728 || 78–40
|- style="text-align:center;background-color:#bbffbb"
| 120 || August 17 || White Sox || 5–3 || Stafford (10–6) || Baumann (9–10) || Arroyo (23) || 25,532 || 79–40
|- style="text-align:center;background-color:#ffbbbb"
| 121 || August 18 || @ Indians || 5–1 || Grant (12–6) || Coates (9–4) || || 37,840 || 79–41
|- style="text-align:center;background-color:#bbffbb"
| 122 || August 19 || @ Indians || 3 – 2  || Ford (21–3) || Locke (4–2) || Arroyo (24) || 23,398 || 80–41
|- style="text-align:center;background-color:#bbffbb"
| 123 || August 20 || @ Indians || 6–0 || Terry (10–1) || Perry (9–11) || || || 81–41
|- style="text-align:center;background-color:#bbffbb"
| 124 || August 20 || @ Indians || 5–2 || Sheldon (9–3) || Bell (8–13) || || 56,307 || 82–41
|- style="text-align:center;background-color:#ffbbbb"
| 125 || August 22 || @ Angels || 4–3 || McBride (10–10) || Stafford (10–7) || || 19,930 || 82–42
|- style="text-align:center;background-color:#bbffbb"
| 126 || August 23 || @ Angels || 8 – 6  || Arroyo (11–3) || Donohue (4–6) || || 19,773 || 83–42
|- style="text-align:center;background-color:#ffbbbb"
| 127 || August 24 || @ Angels || 6–4 || Morgan (6–2) || Coates (9–5) || || 19,819 || 83–43
|- style="text-align:center;background-color:#bbffbb"
| 128 || August 25 || @ Athletics || 3–0 || Terry (11–1) || Archer (8–10) || || 30,830 || 84–43
|- style="text-align:center;background-color:#bbffbb"
| 129 || August 26 || @ Athletics || 5–1 || Stafford (11–7) || Walker (5–11) || || 32,149 || 85–43
|- style="text-align:center;background-color:#bbffbb"
| 130 || August 27 || @ Athletics || 8–7 || Ford (22–3) || Shaw (8–12) || Arroyo (25) || 34,065 || 86–43
|- style="text-align:center;background-color:#ffbbbb"
| 131 || August 29 || @ Twins || 3–0 || Pascual (12–13) || Terry (11–2) || || 40,118 || 86–44
|- style="text-align:center;background-color:#bbffbb"
| 132 || August 30 || @ Twins || 4–0 || Stafford (12–7) || Kaat (7–13) || || 41,357 || 87–44
|- style="text-align:center;background-color:#ffbbbb"
| 133 || August 31 || @ Twins || 5–4 || Kralick (12–9) || Sheldon (9–4) || || 33,709 || 87–45

|- style="text-align:center;background-color:#bbffbb"
| 134 || September 1 || Tigers || 1–0 || Arroyo (12–3) || Mossi (14–4) || || 65,566 || 88–45
|- style="text-align:center;background-color:#bbffbb"
| 135 || September 2 || Tigers || 7–2 || Terry (12–2) || Lary (19–8) || Arroyo (26) || 50,261 || 89–45
|- style="text-align:center;background-color:#bbffbb"
| 136 || September 3 || Tigers || 8–5 || Arroyo (13–3) || Staley (2–5) || || 55,676 || 90–45
|- style="text-align:center;background-color:#bbffbb"
| 137 || September 4 || Senators || 5–3 || Reniff (2–0) || Daniels (8–10) || || || 91–45
|- style="text-align:center;background-color:#bbffbb"
| 138 || September 4 || Senators || 3–2 || Daley (10–16) || Burnside (1–7) || || 34,683 || 92–45
|- style="text-align:center;background-color:#bbffbb"
| 139 || September 5 || Senators || 6–1 || Coates (10–5) || McClain (8–16) || || 16,917 || 93–45
|- style="text-align:center;background-color:#bbffbb"
| 140 || September 6 || Senators || 8–0 || Ford (23–3) || Cheney (1–3) || || 12,295 || 94–45
|- style="text-align:center;background-color:#bbffbb"
| 141 || September 7 || Indians || 7–3 || Terry (13–2) || Stigman (2–4) || || 18,549 || 95–45
|- style="text-align:center;background-color:#bbffbb"
| 142 || September 8 || Indians || 9–1 || Stafford (13–7) || Bell (9–15) || || 41,762 || 96–45
|- style="text-align:center;background-color:#bbffbb"
| 143 || September 9 || Indians || 8–7 || Arroyo (14–3) || Funk (11–10) || || 37,161 || 97–45
|- style="text-align:center;background-color:#bbffbb"
| 144 || September 10 || Indians || 7–6 || Coates (11–5) || Locke (4–4) || Arroyo (27) || || 98–45
|- style="text-align:center;background-color:#bbffbb"
| 145 || September 10 || Indians || 9–3 || Daley (11–16) || Perry (10–14) || || 57,824 || 99–45
|- style="text-align:center;background-color:#bbffbb"
| 146 || September 12 || @ White Sox || 4 – 3  || Terry (14–2) || Pierce (9–9) || || 36,166 || 100–45
|- style="text-align:center;background-color:#ffbbbb"
| 147 || September 14 || @ White Sox || 8–3 || Herbert (10–12) || Sheldon (9–5) || Hacker (7) || || 100–46
|- style="text-align:center;background-color:#ffbbbb"
| 148 || September 14 || @ White Sox || 4–3 || Kemmerer (3–3) || Arroyo (14–4) || || 18,120 || 100–47
|- style="text-align:center;background-color:#bbffbb"
| 149 || September 15 || @ Tigers || 11–1 || Ford (24–3) || Mossi (14–7) || || || 101–47
|- style="text-align:center;background-color:#ffbbbb"
| 150 || September 15 || @ Tigers || 4–2 || Kline (7–8) || Daley (11–17) || || 42,267 || 101–48
|- style="text-align:center;background-color:#ffbbbb"
| 151 || September 16 || @ Tigers || 10–4 || Lary (21–9) || Terry (14–3) || || 35,820 || 101–49
|- style="text-align:center;background-color:#bbffbb"
| 152 || September 17 || @ Tigers || 6 – 4  || Arroyo (15–4) || Fox (4–2) || || 44,219 || 102–49
|- style="text-align:center;background-color:#ffbbbb"
| 153 || September 19 || @ Orioles || 1–0 || Barber (17–11) || Ford (24–4) || || || 102–50
|- style="text-align:center;background-color:#bbffbb"
| 154 || September 19 || @ Orioles || 3–1 || Daley (12–17) || Brown (10–6) || || 31,317 || 103–50
|- style="text-align:center;background-color:#bbffbb"
| 155 || September 20 || @ Orioles || 4–2 || Terry (15–3) || Pappas (12–9) || || 21,032 || 104–50
|- style="text-align:center;background-color:#ffbbbb"
| 156 || September 21 || @ Orioles || 5–3 || Fisher (10–12) || Stafford (13–8) || || 22,089 || 104–51
|- style="text-align:center;background-color:#bbffbb"
| 157 || September 23 || @ Red Sox || 8–3 || Ford (25–4) || Schwall (15–6) || Arroyo (28) || 28,128 || 105–51
|- style="text-align:center;background-color:#ffbbbb"
| 158 || September 24 || @ Red Sox || 3–1 || Monbouquette (14–13) || Arroyo (15–5) || || 30,802 || 105–52
|- style="text-align:center;background-color:#bbffbb"
| 159 || September 26 || Orioles || 3–2 || Sheldon (10–5) || Fisher (10–13) || || 19,401 || 106–52
|- style="text-align:center;background-color:#ffbbbb"
| 160 || September 27 || Orioles || 3–2 || Barber (18–12) || Stafford (13–9) || Hall (4) || 7,594 || 106–53
|- style="text-align:center;background-color:#bbffbb"
| 161 || September 29 || Red Sox || 2–1 || Sheldon (11–5) || Monbouquette (14–14) || || 21,485 || 107–53
|- style="text-align:center;background-color:#bbffbb"
| 162 || September 30 || Red Sox || 3–1 || Terry (16–3) || Schwall (15–7) || Coates (5) || 19,061 || 108–53

|- style="text-align:center;background-color:#bbffbb"
| 163 || October 1 || Red Sox || 1–0 || Stafford (14–9) || Stallard (2–7) || Arroyo (29) || 23,154 || 109–53

|-
| Source:

Postseason Game log

|- align="center" bgcolor="bbffbb"
| 1 || October 4 || Reds || 2–0 || Ford (1–0) || O'Toole (0–1) || || 62,397 || 1–0
|- align="center" bgcolor="ffbbbb"
| 2 || October 5 || Reds || 2–6 || Jay (1–0) || Terry (0–1) || || 63,083 || 1–1
|- align="center" bgcolor="bbffbb"
| 3 || October 7 || @ Reds || 3–2 || Arroyo (1–0) || Purkey (0–1) || || 32,589 || 2–1
|- align="center" bgcolor="bbffbb"
| 4 || October 8 || @ Reds || 7–0 || Ford (2–0) || O'Toole (0–2) || Coates (1) || 32,589 || 3–1
|- align="center" bgcolor="bbffbb"
| 5 || October 9 || @ Reds || 13–5 || Daley (1–0) || Jay (1–1) || || 32,589 || 4–1

Player stats

Batting

Starters by position
Note: Pos = Position; G = Games played; AB = At bats; H = Hits; Avg. = Batting average; HR = Home runs; RBI = Runs batted in

Other batters
Note: G = Games played; AB = At bats; H = Hits; Avg. = Batting average; HR = Home runs; RBI = Runs batted in

Pitching

Starting pitchers
Note: G = Games pitched; IP = Innings pitched; W = Wins; L = Losses; ERA = Earned run average; SO = Strikeouts

Other pitchers
Note: G = Games pitched; IP = Innings pitched; W = Wins; L = Losses; ERA = Earned run average; SO = Strikeouts

Relief pitchers
Note: G = Games pitched; W = Wins; L = Losses; SV = Saves; ERA = Earned run average; SO = Strikeouts

1961 World Series

Awards and honors
 Roger Maris, American League MVP
 Roger Maris, Associated Press Athlete of the Year
 Whitey Ford, Cy Young Award
 Whitey Ford, Babe Ruth Award

1961 All-Star Game
 Whitey Ford, starter, pitcher
 Tony Kubek, starter, shortstop
 Mickey Mantle, starter, center field
 Roger Maris, starter, right field
 Luis Arroyo, reserve
 Yogi Berra, reserve
 Elston Howard, reserve
 Bill Skowron, reserve

League leaders
 Whitey Ford, led league in innings: (283)
 Whitey Ford, led league in games started: (39)
 Whitey Ford, led league in batters faced: (1,159)
 Roger Maris, Major League Baseball home run champion, (61)

Franchise records
 Roger Maris, Yankees single season record, home runs in a season: (61)
 Mickey Mantle, Yankees single season record, home runs by a center fielder: (54)

Team leaders
 Home runs – Roger Maris (61)
 RBI – Roger Maris (142)
 Batting average – Mickey Mantle (.317)
 Hits – Bobby Richardson (173)
 Stolen bases – Mickey Mantle (12)
 Walks – Mickey Mantle (126)
 Wins – Whitey Ford (25)
 Earned run average – Bill Stafford (2.68)
 Strikeouts – Whitey Ford (209)

Farm system

Harlan affiliation shared with Chicago White Sox

Notes

References
1961 New York Yankees at Baseball Reference
1961 World Series
1961 New York Yankees  at Baseball Almanac

New York Yankees seasons
New York Yankees
New York Yankees
1960s in the Bronx
American League champion seasons
World Series champion seasons